Zashondomye is a rural locality (a village) in Plesetsky District, Arkhangelsk Oblast, Russia. The population was 1 as of 2012. There are 3 streets.

Geography 
Zashondomye is located on the Mosha River, 51 km southwest of Plesetsk (the district's administrative centre) by road. Zinovo is the nearest rural locality.

References 

Rural localities in Plesetsky District